Sheikh Saeed bin Tahnun Al Nahyan was the Ruler of Abu Dhabi, one of the Trucial States which today form the United Arab Emirates (UAE), from 1845 to 1855.

Accession 
Saeed acceded following the murder of his uncle, Sheikh Khalifa bin Shakhbut Al Nahyan. The murder led to a period of fighting for the leadership of the Bani Yas, with Sheikh Khalifa's maternal nephew and murderer, Isa bin Khalid al-Falahi attempting to take power but being himself killed by Dhiyab bin Isa. Khalid bin Isa then took Dhiyab's life and fled to Sharjah, leaving two influential leaders of the Bani Yas, Mohammed bin Humaid and Rashid bin Fadhil, to remove a claimant to the fort of Abu Dhabi, one of Khalifa's brothers, and nominate a son of the former leader Tahnun bin Shakhbut Al Nahyan, Saeed bin Tahnun.

Saeed arrived to Abu Dhabi to a smooth accession, supported by his two influential sponsors as well as approved of by the British. He quickly moved to quell a disturbance among the formerly secessionist Qubaisat and brought them to Abu Dhabi, stripped their boats and compelled them to pay their debts, return to the rule of Abu Dhabi and additionally pay a fine.

Buraimi 
Saeed also moved on Buraimi, capturing his two forts back from the Wahhabis with the help of both the Dhawahir and Awamir tribes. He then pulled together the Bani Qitab, Ghafalah, Awamir and Bani Yas in Khatam and placed the Manasir and Mazari Bani Yas in Dhafrah to block the relieving Wahhabi army under Sa'ad bin Mutlaq. By 1850, Saeed's great tribal association had cleared Burami Oasis of Wahhabi forces. He subsequently accepted a stipend from the Sultan of Muscat for the defence of Buraimi.

Uprising 
In 1855, Saeed bin Tahnun was embroiled in a dispute involving the murder by a tribal elder of his own brother. The murder was considered not without justification but Saeed was deaf to the imprecations of the Bani Yas and resolved to have the killer put to death. A promise was made to the man of forgiveness, but when he was brought into Saeed's presence, Saeed drew out his own dagger and killed the man. The resulting violent uprising drove Saeed to take refuge first in his fort and then to exile on the island of Qish.

Saeed was succeeded by Sheikh Zayed bin Khalifa Al Nahyan.

References 

Sheikhs of Abu Dhabi
19th-century monarchs in the Middle East
History of the United Arab Emirates
19th-century Arabs